Cornus elliptica is a species of dogwood found in Fujian, Guangdong, Guangxi, Guizhou, Hubei, Hunan, Jiangxi, Sichuan provinces of China at elevations of 300–2200 meters.

References

External links
 
 
 

elliptica